The  was the second dynasty in the traditional historiography of Okinawa Island. It was established by Shunten in 1187. According to Chūzan Seikan, Shunten's mother was a daughter of the aji, or local chieftain, of Ōzato; his father, Minamoto no Tametomo, was an adventurer from Japan. Prior to becoming king, Shunten was the lord of Urasoe. At that time, Okinawa Island was in great confusion; the last overlord of Tenson dynasty was assassinated by the powerful official named Riyū (利勇), whom promoted himself as paramount chief. Shunten revolted against Riyū and overthrew him. In 1187, Shunten was recognized as the new "king". overlord among aji.

George H. Kerr suggested that the stories of Shunten and Eiso dynasties "reflect the increasing penetration of Japanese influence" among Ryukyu Islands.

The Shunten dynasty had three kings, lasted from 1187 to 1259. The last king Gihon was forced to abdicate to his regent, Eiso, whom established the Eiso dynasty.

List of rulers

Notes

References
 

Ryukyuan monarchy